Eduard Hoesch (15 March 1890 – 5 November 1983) was an Austrian cinematographer and film producer.

Selected filmography

 The Grinning Face (1921)
 Meriota the Dancer (1922)
 The Separating Bridge (1922)
 The Little Sin (1923)
 Hotel Potemkin (1924)
 Colonel Redl (1925)
 A Waltz by Strauss (1925)
 The Young Man from the Ragtrade (1926)
 Her Highness Dances the Waltz (1926)
 The Arsonists of Europe (1926)
 The Orlov (1927)
 Flirtation (1927)
 The Prince's Child (1927)
 German Women - German Faithfulness (1927)
 The Merry Farmer (1927)
 The Gallant Hussar (1928)
 The Little Slave (1928)
 The Most Beautiful Woman in Paris (1928)
 Dyckerpotts' Heirs (1928)
 The Weekend Bride (1928)
 Number 17 (1928)
 Spring Awakening (1929)
 Latin Quarter (1929)
 Lieutenant of His Majesty (1929)
 The Tsarevich (1929)
 Black Forest Girl (1929)
 Rendezvous (1930)
 The Cabinet of Doctor Larifari (1930)
 A Girl from the Reeperbahn (1930)
 Love Songs (1930)
 Madame Bluebeard (1931)
 The Case of Colonel Redl (1931)
 Hyppolit, the Butler (1931)
 When the Soldiers (1931)
 Kadetten (1931)
 An Auto and No Money (1932)
 The Triangle of Fire (1932)
 Laughing Heirs (1933)
 The Flower Girl from the Grand Hotel (1934)
 The Girlfriend of a Big Man (1934)
 The Lucky Diamond (1934)
 Frasquita (1934)
 A Woman Who Knows What She Wants (1934)
 The Gentleman Without a Residence (1934)
 Asew (1935)
 Heaven on Earth (1935)
 Circus Saran (1935)
 Suburban Cabaret (1935)
 The Cossack and the Nightingale (1935)
 The White Horse Inn (1935)
 The Postman from Longjumeau (1936)
 The Cabbie's Song (1936)
 Orders Are Orders (1936)
 The Unfaithful Eckehart (1940)
 Everything for Gloria (1941)
 Alarm (1941)
 My Wife Teresa (1942)
 Peter Voss, Thief of Millions (1946)
 Arlberg Express (1948)
 The Fourth Commandment (1950)
 No Sin on the Alpine Pastures (1950)
 The First Kiss (1954)
 Her First Date (1955)
 Love, Summer and Music (1956)
 When the Bells Sound Clearly (1959)
 Romance in Venice (1962)

Bibliography
 Kester, Bernadette. Film Front Weimar: Representations of the First World War in German films of the Weimar Period (1919-1933). Amsterdam University Press, 2003.

External links

1890 births
1983 deaths
Austrian cinematographers
Austrian film producers
Film people from Vienna